Will E. Redmond (born December 28, 1993) is an American football safety who is a free agent. He played college football at Mississippi State, and was selected by the San Francisco 49ers in the third round of the 2016 NFL Draft. He has also played for the Kansas City Chiefs and Green Bay Packers.

High school career
Redmond attended Manassas High School in Memphis, Tennessee, where he was the starting quarterback for the Tigers team documented in the Oscar-winning documentary film Undefeated. Later, he transferred to East High School in Memphis, Tennessee, where played both sides of the ball and on special teams.

Redmond was rated as a four-star recruit by 247sports.com and Rivals.com, and a three-star recruit by ESPN. Redmond's scholarship offers included Cincinnati, Clemson, Georgia, Illinois, Louisville, Memphis, Miami, North Carolina, Notre Dame, Ohio State, Ole Miss, Purdue, Tennessee, Vanderbilt, and Virginia. Redmond committed to Mississippi State on August 1, 2011, and signed with the Bulldogs the following February, despite a late push from Georgia.

Redmond's recruitment led to Mississippi State being placed on probation after it was revealed that a booster provided Redmond with cash, a credit card, and a $2,000 discount on a car. The university formally disassociated the booster. The NCAA declared Redmond ineligible for the 2012 season and the first five games of the 2013 season. Redmond was also required to repay $2,660 in impermissible benefits.

College career

Sophomore season (2013)
Redmond made his college debut against Bowling Green in October. He recorded 23 tackles that season as a reserve defensive back.

Junior season (2014)
Redmond played in every game for the Bulldogs in 2014. He caught the game-clinching interception in the end zone on the final play to preserve the Bulldog's 34–29 upset win over LSU. He repeated the feat a few weeks later with an end zone interception in the final minute of a 17–10 win over Arkansas. Redmond finished the season with 51 tackles and 3 interceptions.

Senior season (2015)

On October 22, after playing in seven games, Redmond tore his ACL in practice.

College statistics

Professional career

Prior to the draft, Redmond was projected as one of the top cornerbacks in the 2016 NFL Draft by Mel Kiper Jr. and as a first-round pick by Todd McShay, who remarked that Redmond showed "excellent quickness and agility, which is why he gives up little separation in man-to-man coverage."

San Francisco 49ers

Redmond was drafted by the San Francisco 49ers in the third round, 68th overall in the 2016 NFL Draft. On September 5, 2016, he was placed on injured reserve with a knee injury, ending his rookie season before it even started.

On September 1, 2017, Redmond was waived/injured by the 49ers and placed on injured reserve with an ankle injury. He was released by the 49ers on October 31, 2017.

Kansas City Chiefs
On November 9, 2017, Redmond was signed to the Kansas City Chiefs' practice squad. He signed a reserve/future contract with the Chiefs on January 10, 2018.

On September 1, 2018, Redmond was waived by the Chiefs.

Green Bay Packers
On September 11, 2018, Redmond was signed to the Green Bay Packers' practice squad. He was promoted to the active roster on November 6, 2018. On December 22, 2018, he was placed on injured reserve.

On March 27, 2020, Redmond re-signed with the Packers. He re-signed with the team again on April 2, 2021. He was placed on injured reserve on August 24, 2021. The Packers released him from injured reserve on November 22, 2021.

Indianapolis Colts
On December 15, 2021, Redmond was signed to the Indianapolis Colts practice squad. He signed a reserve/future contract on January 10, 2022.

On August 30, 2022, Redmond was released by the Colts and signed to the practice squad the next day. He was released on September 13.

Houston Texans
On November 15, 2022, Redmond signed with the practice squad of the Houston Texans.

NFL career statistics

Regular season

Postseason

References

External links

Green Bay Packers bio
Mississippi State Bulldogs bio

1993 births
Living people
21st-century African-American sportspeople
American football cornerbacks
American football safeties
Mississippi State Bulldogs football players
Players of American football from Memphis, Tennessee
African-American players of American football
San Francisco 49ers players
Kansas City Chiefs players
Green Bay Packers players
Indianapolis Colts players
Houston Texans players